Cryptosoma is a genus of crabs in the family Calappidae, containing the following species:
 Cryptosoma bairdii (Stimpson, 1860)
 Cryptosoma balguerii (Desbonne, in Desbonne & Schramm, 1867)
 Cryptosoma cristatum Brullé, 1837
 Cryptosoma dentatum Brullé, 1839
 Cryptosoma garthi Galil & Clark, 1996
 Cryptosoma orientis Adams & White, 1849
 Cryptosoma pallidum Selenka, de Man & Bülow, 1883
 Cryptosoma strombi Selenka, de Man & Bülow, 1883

References

Calappoidea